The Seman is a major river in western Albania. It is formed by the confluence of the rivers Devoll and Osum, a few km west of Kuçovë. It meanders generally westwards through a flat lowland. Near Fier it receives Gjanica from the left. It flows into the Adriatic Sea at the southern margin of Divjakë-Karavasta National Park.

Name 
In classical antiquity, the Seman River was known as the Apsus, which is a derivative of the Indo-European root *ăp- "water, river". The Illyrian hydronym Apsus, corresponds to Apsias, a river name in southern Italy brought by Illyrian migrations (Iapygians) in the region. The contemporary Albanian name Seman/Semen (definite form: Semani/Semeni), which is used to indicate the lower course of the river, evolved from *Apson- through Albanian phonetic changes. Also the contemporary Albanian name Osum (definite form: Osumi), which is used to indicate the lower course of the river, evolved from *Apsōn(em), but through Bulgarian phonetic changes.

References

Rivers of Albania
Geography of Berat County
Geography of Fier County